Rodolfo Miranda from the University Autonoma de Madrid, was awarded the status of Fellow in the American Physical Society, after they were nominated by their Division of Materials Physics in 2007, for his contributions to surface and thin film magnetism, including new methods of epitaxial growth using surfactants or controlling the morphology at the atomic scale, the identification and characterization of model systems for magnetism in low dimensions, and the observation of magic heights in metallic islands.

References 

Fellows of the American Physical Society
Spanish physicists
Living people
Date of death missing
Year of birth missing (living people)